Thunder Over Arizona is a 1956 American Western film directed by Joseph Kane, written by Sloan Nibley, and starring Skip Homeier, Kristine Miller, George Macready, Wallace Ford, Nacho Galindo and Gregory Walcott. It was released on August 4, 1956, by Republic Pictures. The film was shot in Trucolor and Naturama.

Plot

Colourful western about a crooked landowner.

Cast
Skip Homeier as Tim Mallory
Kristine Miller as Fay Warren
George Macready as Mayor Ervin Plummer
Wallace Ford as Hal Stiles
Nacho Galindo as Pancho Gutierrez
Gregory Walcott as Mark Warren
Jack Elam as Deputy Slats Callahan
George Keymas as Harvard 'Shotgun' Kelly
John Doucette as Deputy Rand
John Compton as Tab Warren
Robert Swan as Jud Warren 
Julian Rivero as Padre Ortega
Francis McDonald as Pliny Warren

References

External links
 

1956 films
American Western (genre) films
1956 Western (genre) films
Republic Pictures films
Films directed by Joseph Kane
Trucolor films
1950s English-language films
1950s American films